The first Konami Cup Asia Series was held in November 2005 with four teams participating. The champions from the domestic leagues in Japan, South Korea and Taiwan along with a team of all stars from China's domestic league took part in the competition. All games were held in the Tokyo Dome in Japan. The tournament was sponsored by the Nippon Professional Baseball Association and Konami. The Chiba Lotte Marines defeated the Samsung Lions in the title game to win the championship for Japan. Outfielder Benny Agbayani was named the MVP of the series.

Participating teams
 China Baseball League (China): China Stars, an all-star team of China Baseball League of China.
 Nippon Professional Baseball (Japan): Chiba Lotte Marines, winner of 2005 Japan Series. Based in Chiba, Japan.
 Korea Baseball Organization (Korea): Samsung Lions, winner of 2005 Korea Series. Based in Daegu, South Korea.
 Chinese Professional Baseball League (Taiwan): Sinon Bulls, winner of 2005 Taiwan Series. Based in Taichung, Taiwan.

Matchups
All times are Japan Standard Time (UTC+9)

November 10

Attendance: 2,643    Time: 2:37

Attendance: 27,305    Time: 3:05

November 11

Attendance: 2,036    Time: 3:15

Attendance: 18,911    Time: 2:20
Note: Game ended at seventh inning due to mercy rule

November 12

Attendance: 26,564    Time: 2:48

Attendance: 6,340    Time: 2:36

Round-Robin Standings

Championship, November 13

Attendance: 37,078    Time: 3:27

External links
KONAMI CUP Asia Series 2005
KONAMI CUP Asia Series

Asia Series
Asia
International baseball competitions hosted by Japan
Asia Series
Asia Series
Asia Series
Sports competitions in Tokyo